The umbra is the innermost and darkest part of a shadow, where the light source is completely blocked by the occluding body.

Umbra may also refer to:

Brands and companies
 Umbra (typeface), an American typeface designed by R. Hunter Middleton
 Umbra (company), a Toronto-based designer and manufacturer of houseware
 Umbra (3D technology company), a video game middleware company

Fictional characters, locations and objects
 Umbra (comics), a member of the Legion of Super-Heroes
 Umbra (World of Darkness), a realm within the World of Darkness universe
 Lord Umbra, the main antagonist of the animated television series Mighty Orbots
 Umbra Witches, a clan of witches in the video game series Bayonetta
 Umbra, a sphere-like creature in Warhammer 40,000
 Umbra, a sword and multiple characters in The Elder Scrolls series
 Queen Umbra, the final boss of Child of Light
 Excalibur Umbra, a player character in Warframe
 Umbra, the boss of Night 4 of the Solar Eclipse event in TDS, a Roblox game
 Umbra, a Roblox Bedwars kit earned on level 35 in the Season 7 freepass

Music
 Umbra (album), a 2001 album by Boom Boom Satellites
 Umbra, a song by Karnivool from the 2009 album Sound Awake

Other uses
 Shade (mythology) or umbra, the spirit or ghost of a dead person, residing in the underworld 
 Umbra (fish), a genus of freshwater fishes of the family Umbridae
 Umbra (poets), a collective of young black writers who published Umbra Magazine
 Umbra, the circular dark region of a sunspot that is surrounded by the semi-bright penumbra

See also
 Umber, a brown clay pigment
 Penumbra (disambiguation)